The 2014–15 Euro Hockey League was the eighth season of the Euro Hockey League, Europe's premier club field hockey tournament organized by the European Hockey Federation. Round One was held in Barcelona, Spain from 10 to 12 October 2014 and the knockout stage was held in Bloemendaal, Netherlands from 1 to 6 April 2015.

The final was played between UHC Hamburg and Oranje Zwart at HC Bloemendaal in Bloemendaal, Netherlands. Oranje Zwart beat Hamburg 6–5 in a shoot-out to win their first Euro Hockey League title. Harvestehude were the title holders, but were eliminated by Dragons in the round of 16.

Round one
Round one was held from 10 until 12 October 2014 in Barcelona, Spain. In each group, teams played against each other once in a round-robin format. The pool winners advanced to the round of 16. If a game was won, the winning team received 5 points. A draw resulted in both teams receiving 2 points. A loss gave the losing team 1 point unless the losing team lost by 3 or more goals, then they received 0 points.

Pool A

Pool B

Pool C

Pool D

Knockout stage
The knockout stage was played from 1–6 April 2015, in Bloemendaal, Netherlands.

Bracket

Round of 16

Quarter-finals

Semi-finals

Bronze medal match

Final

References

External links
Official website

Euro Hockey League
2014–15 in European field hockey
October 2014 sports events in Europe
April 2015 sports events in Europe